Gegham Ter-Karapetian (1865-1918), better known by his pen name Msho Gegham (Մշոյ Գեղամ), is a renowned Armenian writer and politician.

Biography 
Ter-Karapetian was born in 1865 in the village of Kheybian in Bitlis Vilayet, Ottoman Empire.

He was a major writer of Western Armenian provincial literature. He was also a respected journalist and statesman.

Ter-Karapetian served as a deputy in the Ottoman Chamber of Deputies from the Armenian Revolutionary Federation.

References 

1865 births
1918 deaths
Armenian-language writers
Armenians from the Ottoman Empire
Politicians of the Ottoman Empire
People from Bitlis
20th-century writers from the Ottoman Empire
Political office-holders in the Ottoman Empire